Tesla STEM High School (formerly STEM High School) is a magnet school in Redmond, Washington. It is a designated Choice School in the Lake Washington School District and offers a STEM-based curriculum. , by US News Rankings, Tesla STEM is the number 1 high school in Washington, number 12 in the nation, and number 9 for magnet schools. The school operates as a magnet program.  Students are admitted from across the district on a lottery basis with 150 students per grade for a total enrollment of 600 students.

History and facilities
The school opened in September 2012 in Eastlake High School until the new facility was sufficiently completed for partial occupancy by grades 9 and 10 in January 2013.  The full school opened and admitted grades 11 and 12 in September 2013 and September 2014, respectively.  The two-story school occupies a 21-acre campus.  It was constructed by Absher Construction Company for $24 million.

Modular building techniques were used to construct the school due to permitting and time restrictions.  The majority of the building was fabricated offsite, with 4 sections (including the common area) built on site.

Academics
The school's stated academic approach involves problem-based learning, professiobal learning community, integrated curricula, scientific inquiry, and constructivist learning. The core program is focused on the four STEM fields:  Science, Technology, Engineering, and Math.  Most students attend classes in the advanced sciences.  Students in grades 9 and 10 focus on learning the basics of a variety of courses; in grades 11 and 12 students choose a focus of study.  In the 2014–15 academic year, the school began four “Signature Programs” to students from the four comprehensive high schools in the School District:  Eastlake High School, Juanita High School, Lake Washington High School, and Redmond High School. Eleventh graders are given the choice between two signature labs: Environmental Engineering and Sustainable Design, or AP Psychology / Forensics. Twelfth graders may either take the Advanced Physics Lab (AP Physics C: Electricity and Magnetism and AP Physics C: Mechanics) or Biomedical Engineering alongside Anatomy and Physiology.

Athletics and clubs
Athletics and sports programs are not offered at the school. Students participating in those programs need to travel to their "home" high school. Clubs, however, are offered. Notable clubs include science olympiad, astronomy, fitness club and science bowl.

Courses and pathways offered 
Tesla STEM's course catalog can be found here.

A total of 12 AP courses are offered, including AP Computer Science Principles (9), AP Biology (10, optional), AP Environmental Science (10),  AP Language and Composition (11, optional), AP US History (11, not an AP class anymore, but many students still take the exam), AP Physics C: Electricity and Magnetism and AP Physics C: Mechanics (12, optional senior lab), AP Calculus AB (varies, 11th most common), AP Calculus BC (varies and optional, 12th most common), AP Computer Science A (elective), AP Chemistry (elective), and AP Statistics (elective).

Typical learning pathways at Tesla STEM include the computer science pathway (AP CS Principles (9), AP CSA (10), Data Structures (11), Advanced Projects in Java (12)), the engineering pathway (Engineering, Engineering 2, Engineering 3), and the life sciences pathway (AP Biology (10), AP Psychology (11), Biomedical Engineering and Anatomy/Physiology (12)).

Four signature labs are offered at STEM, with students being given the option to choose two of them. In 11th grade, students have the choice between Environmental Engineering / Sustainable Design and AP Psychology / Forensics, whereas in 12th grade students choose between the Advanced Physics Lab and Biomedical Engineering / Anatomy and Physiology.

References

External links
 LWSD School Web Page
 OSPI School report card for "Unnamed STEM School Under Construction" 2013
 Grand Challenges for Engineering, The National Academy of Engineering 
 M SPACE Holdings

Public high schools in Washington (state)
High schools in King County, Washington
Schools in Redmond, Washington
2012 establishments in Washington (state)
Prefabricated buildings